Stefan Kenić (born April 27, 1997) is a Serbian professional basketball player for Twarde Pierniki Toruń of the Polish Basketball League (PLK). He played college basketball for the Cleveland State Vikings and the Chattanooga Mocs.

Early career 
Kenić grew up with Crvena zvezda youth teams. He won the 2014 Euroleague NIJT.

College career 
On Jun 02, 2017, Kenić, committed to play basketball for the Cleveland State Vikings.

As a freshman, Kenić appeared in 35 games (including 31 starts) at the Cleveland State Vikings in their 2017–18 season. He made the first career start against the Akron on November 11, 2017 with nine points, three rebounds, two blocks and two steals. In the freshman season he averaged 9.5 points and 3.3 rebounds per game.

Professional career 
On May 13, 2015, Kenić signed the first professional contract with Crvena zvezda. He was loaned to FMP for the 2015–16 season. During the 2016–17 season, he played for the Smederevo 1953.

In August 2021, Kenić signed for the Bosnian team Borac Banja Luka.

On July 31, 2022, he has signed with Twarde Pierniki Toruń of the Polish Basketball League (PLK).

National team career 
Kenić was a member of the Serbian U-16 national basketball team that won the silver medal at the 2013 FIBA Europe Under-16 Championship in Ukraine. He was a member of the Serbian U-17 national basketball team that won the bronze medal at the 2014 FIBA Under-17 World Championship in the United Arab Emirates.

References

External links 
 Player Profile at realgm.com
 Player Profile at ESPN
 Player Profile at eurobasket.com
 Player Profile at sports-reference.com

1997 births
Living people
Basketball players from Belgrade
Basketball League of Serbia players
Cleveland State Vikings men's basketball players
Chattanooga Mocs men's basketball players
KK Crvena zvezda youth players
KK FMP players
KK Smederevo players
OKK Borac players
Serbian expatriate basketball people in Bosnia and Herzegovina
Serbian expatriate basketball people in the United States
Serbian men's basketball players
Small forwards
Twarde Pierniki Toruń players